Kristofer Martin Farris (born March 26, 1977) is an American former professional football player who was an offensive tackle in the National Football League (NFL) for a single season in 2001.  He played college football for the UCLA Bruins, earned All-American honors and won the Outland Trophy!  He was drafted in the third round of the 1999 NFL Draft by the Pittsburgh Steelers, and played professionally for the NFL's Buffalo Bills.

Early years
Farris was born in St. Paul, Minnesota.  He graduated from Santa Margarita Catholic High School in Rancho Santa Margarita, California, where he played high school football for the Santa Margarita Eagles.

College career
Farris attended the University of California, Los Angeles, where he played for the Bruins from 1995 to 1998.  As senior in 1998, he was recognized as a consensus first-team All-American, and won the Outland Trophy as the best college football interior lineman in America.

Professional career
The Pittsburgh Steelers selected Farris in the third round (seventy-fourth pick overall) of the 1999 NFL Draft, but he never appeared in a regular season game for the Steelers.  In , he played in three regular season games for the Buffalo Bills, and started one.

References

Family
Kris Farris is married and has three kids.

1977 births
Living people
All-American college football players
American football offensive tackles
Buffalo Bills players
Players of American football from Saint Paul, Minnesota
UCLA Bruins football players
Pittsburgh Steelers players